The electoral district of Mill Park is an electoral district of the Victorian Legislative Assembly.

Members for Mill Park

Election results

References

External links
 Electorate profile: Mill Park District, Victorian Electoral Commission

1992 establishments in Australia
Electoral districts of Victoria (Australia)
City of Whittlesea
Electoral districts and divisions of Greater Melbourne